Moneró is a neighborhood in the North Zone of Rio de Janeiro, Brazil. It has 6,304 inhabitants and a HDI of 0,904

Neighbourhoods in Rio de Janeiro (city)